The Crofting Commission took the place of the Crofters Commission on 1 April 2012 as the statutory regulator for crofting in Scotland. Based in Inverness, it is an executive non-departmental public body of the Scottish Government. The Commission comprises six Crofting Commissioners elected from geographic areas in the crofting counties, and three Commissioners appointed by the Scottish Government.  The Convener is appointed from among Commission members.  The Commission is supported by around 60 staff led by a Chief Executive.

The vision of the Commission is to be a guiding regulator that uses its powers to support the crofting system.  Its purpose is to regulate the crofting system fairly and reasonably to protect it for future generations.

The Commission encourages crofters to understand their legal responsibilities as crofts are a valuable resource that should be available both now and in the future for existing crofters and new entrants to crofting to use productively. 

All crofters, both tenant and owner-occupier crofters, are required to comply with a number of statutory duties relating to residency and management of their crofts. 

All tenants or owner-occupier crofters of a croft have a legal duty to comply with all three of the following duties:

 Be ordinarily resident on, or within  of, their croft; 
 Cultivate and maintain their croft or put it to another purposeful use and 
 Not to misuse or neglect their croft. 

Self-regulation means crofters stay in control over what happens to their croft, choosing options so they can contribute to the future of the croft, township and to the whole system of crofting. 

However, where a crofter fails to comply with their duties the Commission can investigate the breach of duty and take action if necessary. Where a suspected breach has occurred, members of crofting community; Grazings Committees/Constables and Assessors can report crofters who they consider are not complying with their duties to the Commission.

The first Crofters Commission was established in 1886 by the Crofters' Holdings (Scotland) Act. The modern Crofters Commission was established by the Crofters (Scotland) Act 1955. The name of the Commission changed to the Crofting Commission in 2012 following the coming into force of the Crofting Reform (Scotland) Act 2010.

References

External links
 Crofting Commission

Crofting
Executive non-departmental public bodies of the Scottish Government
Organisations based in Inverness
Government agencies established in 1955
1955 establishments in Scotland
Scotland's Environmental and Rural Services
Regulators of Scotland